The 2015–16 UEFA Women's Champions League qualifying round was played on 11, 13 and 16 August 2015. A total of 32 teams competed in the qualifying round to decide eight of the 32 places in the knockout phase of the 2015–16 UEFA Women's Champions League.

Draw
The draw was held on 25 June 2015, 13:30 CEST, at the UEFA headquarters in Nyon, Switzerland. The 32 teams were allocated into four seeding positions based on their UEFA club coefficients at the beginning of the season. They were drawn into eight groups of four containing one team from each of the four seeding positions. First, the eight teams which were pre-selected as hosts were drawn from their own designated pot and allocated to their respective group as per their seeding positions. Next, the remaining 24 teams were drawn from their respective pot which were allocated according to their seeding positions.

Below are the 32 teams which participated in the qualifying round (with their 2015 UEFA club coefficients, which took into account their performance in European competitions from 2010–11 to 2014–15 plus 33% of their association coefficient from the same time span), with the eight teams which were pre-selected as hosts marked by (H).

Format
In each group, teams played against each other in a round-robin mini-tournament at the pre-selected hosts. The eight group winners advanced to the round of 32 to join the 24 teams which qualified directly.

Tiebreakers
The teams were ranked according to points (3 points for a win, 1 point for a draw, 0 points for a loss). If two or more teams were equal on points on completion of the group matches, the following criteria were applied in the order given to determine the rankings (regulations Articles 14.01 and 14.02):
higher number of points obtained in the group matches played among the teams in question;
superior goal difference from the group matches played among the teams in question;
higher number of goals scored in the group matches played among the teams in question;
if, after having applied criteria 1 to 3, teams still had an equal ranking, criteria 1 to 3 were reapplied exclusively to the matches between the teams in question to determine their final rankings. If this procedure did not lead to a decision, criteria 5 to 9 applied;
superior goal difference in all group matches;
higher number of goals scored in all group matches;
if only two teams had the same number of points, and they were tied according to criteria 1 to 6 after having met in the last round of the group, their rankings were determined by a penalty shoot-out (not used if more than two teams had the same number of points, or if their rankings were not relevant for qualification for the next stage).
lower disciplinary points total based only on yellow and red cards received in all group matches (red card = 3 points, yellow card = 1 point, expulsion for two yellow cards in one match = 3 points);
higher club coefficient.

Groups
All times were CEST (UTC+2). All match attendances are provided by a source independent from UEFA.

Group 1

Group 2

Group 3

Group 4

Group 5

Group 6

Group 7

Group 8

Statistics
There were 235 goals in 48 matches in the qualifying round, for an average of 4.90 goals per match.

Top goalscorers

Top assists

References

External links
2015–16 UEFA Women's Champions League

1